Richard Ernest Bellman (August 26, 1920 – March 19, 1984) was an American applied mathematician, who introduced dynamic programming in 1953, and made important contributions in other fields of mathematics, such as biomathematics. He founded the leading biomathematical journal Mathematical Biosciences.

Biography
Bellman was born in 1920 in New York City to non-practising Jewish parents of Polish and Russian descent, Pearl (née Saffian) and John James Bellman, who ran a small grocery store on Bergen Street near Prospect Park, Brooklyn. On his religious views, he was an atheist. He attended Abraham Lincoln High School, Brooklyn in 1937, and studied mathematics at Brooklyn College where he earned a BA in 1941. He later earned an MA from the University of Wisconsin. During World War II he worked for a Theoretical Physics Division group in Los Alamos. In 1946 he received his Ph.D at Princeton under the supervision of Solomon Lefschetz. Beginning 1949 Bellman worked for many years at RAND corporation and it was during this time that he developed dynamic programming.

Later in life, Richard Bellman's interests began to emphasize biology and medicine, which he identified as "the frontiers of contemporary science". In 1967, he became founding editor of the journal Mathematical Biosciences, which rapidly became (and remains) one of the most important journals in the field of Mathematical Biology. In 1985, the Bellman Prize in Mathematical Biosciences was created in his honor, being awarded biannually to the journal's best research paper.

Bellman was diagnosed with a brain tumor in 1973, which was removed but resulted in complications that left him severely disabled. He was a professor at the University of Southern California, a Fellow in the American Academy of Arts and Sciences (1975), a member of the National Academy of Engineering (1977), and a member of the National Academy of Sciences (1983).

He was awarded the IEEE Medal of Honor in 1979, "for contributions to decision processes and control system theory, particularly the creation and application of dynamic programming". His key work is the Bellman equation.

Work

Bellman equation
A Bellman equation, also known as a dynamic programming equation, is a necessary condition for optimality associated with the mathematical optimization method known as dynamic programming. Almost any problem which can be solved using optimal control theory can also be solved by analyzing the appropriate Bellman equation. The Bellman equation was first applied to engineering control theory and to other topics in applied mathematics, and subsequently became an important tool in economic theory.

Hamilton–Jacobi–Bellman equation
The Hamilton–Jacobi–Bellman equation (HJB) is a partial differential equation which is central to optimal control theory. The solution of the HJB equation is the 'value function', which gives the optimal cost-to-go for a given dynamical system with an associated cost function. Classical variational problems, for example, the brachistochrone problem can be solved using this method as well. The equation is a result of the theory of dynamic programming which was pioneered in the 1950s by Richard Bellman and coworkers. The corresponding discrete-time equation is usually referred to as the Bellman equation. In continuous time, the result can be seen as an extension of earlier work in classical physics on the Hamilton–Jacobi equation by William Rowan Hamilton and Carl Gustav Jacob Jacobi.

Curse of dimensionality

The curse of dimensionality is an expression coined by Bellman to describe the problem caused by the exponential increase in volume associated with adding extra dimensions to a (mathematical) space. One implication of the curse of dimensionality is that some methods for numerical solution of the Bellman equation require vastly more computer time when there are more state variables in the value function. For example, 100 evenly spaced sample points suffice to sample a unit interval with no more than 0.01 distance between points; an equivalent sampling of a 10-dimensional unit hypercube with a lattice with a spacing of 0.01 between adjacent points would require 1020 sample points: thus, in some sense, the 10-dimensional hypercube can be said to be a factor of 1018 "larger" than the unit interval. (Adapted from an example by R. E. Bellman, see below.)

Bellman–Ford algorithm
Though discovering the algorithm after Ford he is referred to in the Bellman–Ford algorithm, also sometimes referred to as the Label Correcting Algorithm, computes single-source shortest paths in a weighted digraph where some of the edge weights may be negative. Dijkstra's algorithm accomplishes the same problem with a lower running time, but requires edge weights to be non-negative.

Publications
Over the course of his career he published 619 papers and 39 books. During the last 11 years of his life he published over 100 papers despite suffering from crippling complications of brain surgery (Dreyfus, 2003). A selection:
 1957. Dynamic Programming
 1959. Asymptotic Behavior of Solutions of Differential Equations
 1961. An Introduction to Inequalities
 1961. Adaptive Control Processes: A Guided Tour
 1962. Applied Dynamic Programming
 1967. Introduction to the Mathematical Theory of Control Processes
 1970. Algorithms, Graphs and Computers
 1972. Dynamic Programming and Partial Differential Equations
 1982. Mathematical Aspects of Scheduling and Applications
 1983. Mathematical Methods in Medicine
 1984. Partial Differential Equations
 1984. Eye of the Hurricane: An Autobiography, World Scientific Publishing.
 1985. Artificial Intelligence
 1995. Modern Elementary Differential Equations
 1997. Introduction to Matrix Analysis
 2003. Dynamic Programming
 2003. Perturbation Techniques in Mathematics, Engineering and Physics
 2003. Stability Theory of Differential Equations (originally publ. 1953)

References

Further reading
 J.J. O'Connor and E.F. Robertson (2005). Biography of Richard Bellman from the MacTutor History of Mathematics.
 Stuart Dreyfus (2002). "Richard Bellman on the Birth of Dynamic Programming". In: Operations Research. Vol. 50, No. 1, Jan–Feb 2002, pp. 48–51.
 Stuart Dreyfus (2003) "Richard Ernest Bellman". In: International Transactions in Operational Research. Vol 10, no. 5, pp. 543–545.

Articles
Bellman, R.E, Kalaba, R.E, Dynamic Programming and Feedback Control, RAND Corporation, P-1778, 1959.

External links

Harold J. Kushner's speech on Richard Bellman, when accepting the Richard E. Bellman Control Heritage Award (click on "2004: Harold J. Kushner")
IEEE biography

Author profile in the database zbMATH
Biography of Richard Bellman from the Institute for Operations Research and the Management Sciences (INFORMS)

1920 births
1984 deaths
20th-century American mathematicians
Jewish American atheists
American people of Polish-Jewish descent
American people of Russian-Jewish descent
Brooklyn College alumni
Applied mathematicians
Control theorists
Game theorists
Fellows of the American Academy of Arts and Sciences
Members of the United States National Academy of Engineering
IEEE Medal of Honor recipients
John von Neumann Theory Prize winners
Princeton University alumni
University of Wisconsin–Madison alumni
University of Southern California faculty
Richard E. Bellman Control Heritage Award recipients
Abraham Lincoln High School (Brooklyn) alumni
Mathematicians from New York (state)